Martha Brockenbrough is an American author of fiction and nonfiction for children and adults. Her first book, It Could Happen To You: Diary Of A Pregnancy and Beyond, was published by Andrews McMeel Publishing in 2002. She is the founder of The Society for the Promotion of Good Grammar (SPOGG) and of National Grammar Day (observed in the United States since 2008).

Life
Brockenbrough was born in Seattle, Washington, and graduated in 1992 from Stanford University, where she studied Classics and English. She was editor-in-chief of the student newspaper, the Stanford Daily.

Career
Brockenbrough was editor of MSN.com and was an educational humor columnist for Encarta.com before its demise in 2009. She founded National Grammar Day in 2008.

Writing awards
Brockenbrough's young adult novel The Game of Love and Death, published 2015, was a finalist for the 2015 Kirkus Prize,. The book was selected as one of the Top 10 Romances for Youth by the American Library Association's publication, Booklist. It is also a nominee for YALSA's Best Books For Young Adults in 2016. It was listed as one of Publishers Weekly's Best Books of 2015, and won the 2016 Washington State Book Awards in the category Books For Young Adults.

In spring 2016, The Discovery Channel published Brockenbrough's Shark Week: Everything You Need to Know. Publishers Weekly recommended the book to young readers.

Prior to The Game of Love and Death, Brockenbrough wrote Devine Intervention, a Kirkus Reviews Top 100 Books for Teens selection in 2012, and was selected by the Kansas State Reading Circle. It also won a Pacific Northwest Booksellers Association book award for 2016.

Bibliography

Fiction

Non-fiction
 
 
 
 
 
Brockenbrough, Martha (November 13, 2018) Unpresidented: A Biography of Donald Trump. Feiwel & Friends. .

References

21st-century American novelists
American children's writers
American young adult novelists
Writers from Seattle
21st-century American women writers
American women novelists
Living people
American women children's writers
Women writers of young adult literature
Novelists from Washington (state)
Year of birth missing (living people)